The Pyramids of Giza: Facts, Legends and Mysteries (US title: The Great Pyramids) is a 2006 illustrated monograph by French Egyptologist Jean-Pierre Corteggiani.

Synopsis 
Drawing on archives throughout history and scientific inspection, Corteggiani illustrates the myth and reality in a historical chronicle of the three Great Pyramids of Giza, which are the only one of the Seven Wonders of the Ancient World that still stands today. These gigantic, time-defying tombs, erected more than 4500 years ago, have never ceased to arouse great admiration and the wildest speculations. Their popularity is evident in classical texts, Arab legends and accounts of Western travellers.

In addition to the central enigma, the question of how the pyramids were built, the author guides readers through historical theories, sketches and excavations, including the pseudoscientific theory of pyramidology, and research carried out by amateur Egyptologists  and Jean-Yves Verd'hurt in a previously unknown chamber of the Great Pyramid.

Contents 

Body text
 Opening: a succession of full-page old photographs
 Chapter 1: 'From Herodotus to Napoleon'
 Chapter 2: 'Soldiers, Pioneers and Adventurers'
 Chapter 3: 'The Scientific Era'
 Chapter 4: 'The Cemetery Complex'
 Chapter 5: 'Theses, Hypotheses and Realities'

Documents
 The Pyramids Seen by the Ancients
 An Arabic Perspective
 Travellers from the West
 The Age of Discovery
 Khufu's Chamber
 Chronology of the Pyramids
 List of Illustrations
 Index
 Picture Credits/Acknowledgments

Reception 
The historian Maurice Sartre wrote for Le Monde, 'Jean-Pierre Corteggiani recounts the discovery of the pyramids from Ancient Greeks to Napoleon with science and humour'.

In his review for the academic journal  of the Oriental Institute of the University of Lisbon, Pedro de Abreu Malheiro thinks that 'the book proves to be particularly useful for all those who wish to obtain a comprehensive and accessible view of the Pyramids of Giza. However, as it is a work of popularisation, it does not replace works of deeper and more thorough research, such as those by J.-P. Lauer, I. E. S. Edwards, R. Stadelmann and M. Lehner, so it could be a perfect supplement'.

In the British Egyptology magazine Ancient Egypt, the review says: 'This is a very small book, with just 128 pages, but crammed with information (using a small type font) and with many illustrations. Books on the pyramids are all too common, but this volume provides a sensible overview of the Giza pyramids, the history of their exploration and the various theories and hypotheses that have grown up around them, and compares these theories with the realities and recent archaeological discoveries.'

In the British travel magazine Wanderlust, the review says: 'One of the best little guides we have seen to the only Ancient Wonder still standing.'

See also 
 Egyptian pyramids
 Pyramid of Khafre
 Pyramid of Menkaure
 Orion correlation theory
 Egyptian pyramid construction techniques
 In the 'Découvertes Gallimard' collection:
 The Search for Ancient Egypt by Jean Vercoutter
 Coptic Egypt: The Christians of the Nile by Christian Cannuyer
 Mummies: A Voyage Through Eternity by Françoise Dunand
 Champollion : Un scribe pour l'Égypte by

References

External links 
  

2006 non-fiction books
Egyptology books
Découvertes Gallimard